The 3rd Division (alternatively: Division 3, Lion Division, 3rd Infantry Division) is a division of the Sudan People's Liberation Army (SPLA) (later South Sudan Defense Force). It’s based in Wunyiik, Aweil East County Northern Bhar El Ghazal , and it’s believed to be the strongest group among 9 other  military divisions. Mathiang Anyoor based in Pantit, Aweil West, is part of Division 3.

While planning for the division's establishment was underway in 2005, the division was not actually established in the field until 2006.

Elements of the 3rd and 5th Divisions in Lakes and Western Bahr el Ghazal rebelled in March 2010, complaining about a lack of food and pay and prompting the Chief of General Staff to secure approval for emergency funding directly from the president.

References

Military of South Sudan
Divisions (military units)
Military units and formations established in 2006